Graham David Harding (born 19 October 1966) is an English former cricketer.

Harding was born at Oldham. He was educated at Nottingham High School, before going up to Durham University, where he was awarded a palatinate for his cricketing activities. While studying at Durham, Harding was selected in the British Universities squad for the 1988 Benson & Hedges Cup, making two List A one-day appearances in the competition against Gloucestershire at Bristol, and Hampshire at Fenner's. He scored 3 runs in his two matches, as well as taking a single wicket.

References

External links

1966 births
Living people
People from Oldham
People educated at Nottingham High School
English cricketers
British Universities cricketers
Alumni of St Chad's College, Durham